The discography of Scatman John, an American scat and dance musician occasionally known under his real name John Larkin, consists of five studio albums, one compilation album, eight singles and five music videos.

Albums

Studio albums

Compilation albums

Singles

Music videos

References

External links 
 Scatman John at AllMusic
 
 
 Scatland, in loving memory of John Larkin

Discographies of American artists